Air Vice Marshal Mohammad Mostafizur Rahman GUP, ndc, psc is a Bangladesh Air Force officer and currently appointed as the Bangladeshi Ambassador to the Republic of Indonesia.

Career 
The Air Vice Marshal Rahman was commissioned in the Bangladesh Air Force in 1987. He obtained his bachelor's degree in aeronautics from Rajshahi University and master's degree in social welfare from Dhaka University.

References 

Bangladesh Air Force personnel
Bangladesh Air Force
University of Rajshahi alumni
Bangladeshi diplomats
University of Dhaka alumni
Ambassadors of Bangladesh to Indonesia
Year of birth missing (living people)
Living people